Lou Yulie (born October 10, 1934) is professor of philosophy and religious studies at Peking University who serves as Honorary Dean of Institutes of Religion and Culture and was the founding director of the Institute of Chinese Buddhist Cultural Studies. Lou has worked on the area of history of Chinese Philosophy, Chinese Buddhism and Buddhist philosophy in Peking University for more than 50 years. He is well known nationally and internationally for his study of the history of Chinese philosophy, especially the study of metaphysics during the Wei and Jin period (AD 220-420) and the modern philosophy of China, as well as the promotion of Chinese culture.

Biography
Lou was born on October 10, 1934, in Hangzhou, Zhejiang, with his ancestral home in Shengzhou. After the high school of Pujiang High School, he studied, then taught, at what is now Peking University. He was appointed lecturer of the Department of Philosophy, Peking University, in June 1979, becoming associate professor in December 1980 and professor in September 1985. In December 1989, he was elected a member of Academic Committee of the Peking University. Lou served as vice-president of the National Academy of Religion between 1988 and 1995, and a member of the Academic Degrees Committee of the State Council from 1992 to 1997.

Works
 A Refresher: A Collection of Papers on Chinese Philosophy
 Collation of the Works of Wang Bi
 Buddhism and the Spirit of Humanism in China

Award
 Collation of the Works of Wang Bi - Third place prize from the National Ancient Books Collation

References

1934 births
Educators from Hangzhou
Living people
Peking University alumni
Writers from Hangzhou
Academic staff of Peking University